The 71st Louisiana Legislature is the current sitting of the Louisiana State Legislature.

House Members

Senate Members

References

See also 

Louisiana legislative sessions
Louisiana State Legislature
2022 U.S. legislative sessions
2020s in Louisiana